Varallo is a surname. Notable people with the surname include:

 Anthony Varallo (born 1970), English professor at the College of Charleston
 Francisco Varallo (1910–2010), Argentine football forward player
 Marcello Varallo (born 1947), Italian alpine skier
 Mary Varallo (1897–1979), American politician

See also

Varallo (disambiguation)

References

surnames